Robin Hood and the Pirates is a 1960 Italian adventure film directed by Giorgio Simonelli, and starring Lex Barker and Jackie Lane.

Plot 
Robin Hood, the protagonist, leaves Sherwood Forest, and joins the pirates. After several fights and many adventures, he gets bored, and decides to return to his homeland. He discovers that his father has been killed, and that a usurper has taken the throne. He begins his life as fighter who defends the poor against the rich.

Cast

 Lex Barker as Robin Hood
 Jackie Lane as Kareen Blain
 Rossana Rory as Lizbeth Brooks
 Mario Scaccia as Jonathan Brooks
 Walter Barnes as Guercio / Orbo
 Edith Peters as Palla di Grasso
 Giulio Donnini as Golia
 Renato Chiantoni as Gladiacove
 Mario Passante as Brooks' friend
 Marco Tulli as Friar Lorenzo
 Gino Buzzanca as Captain Uncini
 Umberto Sacripante as Philips
 Renato Terra as Barbanera

Release
Robin Hood and the Pirates was released in Italy on 24 December 1960. The film was released in the United States in 1964.

References

Bibliography

External links

Italian adventure films
1960 adventure films
Films directed by Giorgio Simonelli
Pirate films
Robin Hood films
1960s Italian films